Sharon D. Welch (born November 11, 1952) is an academic scholar, social ethicist and author of six books on ethics, theology, politics, religion and spirituality. After having served as Provost and Professor of Religion for ten years, she is currently Affiliate Faculty member at Meadville Lombard Theological School.

Welch is currently a member of the Unitarian Universalist Peace Ministry Network and the Cook County League of Women Voters, a Fellow of the Institute for Humanist Studies, and serves on the Board of Renewal in the Wilderness.

Prior to joining the faculty at Meadville Lombard Theological School, Welch has held positions as Professor and Chair of Religious Studies, Professor of Women's and Gender Studies and Adjunct Professor of Educational Leadership and Policy Analysis at the University of Missouri (1991–2007); she was also Assistant and then Associate Professor of Theology and Religion and Society at Harvard Divinity School (1982–1991).

Welch received Distinguished Alumna award for 2019 from Vanderbilt Divinity School.

Books 
 Communities of Resistance and Solidarity: A Feminist Theology of Liberation (1985, Orbis Books; 2017, Wipf and Stock)
 A Feminist Ethic of Risk (1990, 2000 Revised Second Edition, Fortress Press)
 Sweet Dreams in America: Making Ethics and Spirituality Work (1999, Routledge)
 After Empire: The Art and Ethos of Enduring Peace (2004, Fortress Press)
 Real Peace, Real Security: The Challenges of Global Citizenship (2008, Fortress Press)
 After the Protests Are Heard: Enacting Civic Engagement and Social Transformation (2018, NYU Press)

References

External links 
 

Living people
Meadville Lombard Theological School faculty
1952 births